A continental tie also called a crossover tie is a type of bow tie partly covered by the dress shirt collar.

External links
 Why You Should Try Out Orlando Bloom's 'Continental Tie' At Your Next Formal Do
 Flashback: The Continental Tie — Gentleman's Gazette

Neckties
Neckwear